The 1990 Ballon d'Or, given to the best football player in Europe as judged by a panel of sports journalists from UEFA member countries, was awarded to Lothar Matthäus on 25 December 1990.

Rankings

References

External links
 France Football Official Ballon d'Or page

1990
1990–91 in European football